Ataus Samad (16 November 1937 – 26 September 2012) was a Bangladeshi journalist. He was awarded Ekushey Padak in 1992 by the Government of Bangladesh.

Early life and education
Samad was born November 16, 1937, in Kishoreganj District. He earned post graduation degree from University of Dhaka in 1959. He worked at Press Institute of Bangladesh (PIB) for a long time.

Career
Samad started his journalism career in 1959. He was the chief reporter of the Pakistan Observer from 1965 to 1969. He was the general secretary of the East Pakistan Union of Journalists from 1969 to 1970. Between 1982 and 1994, Samad was the special correspondent of BBC in Dhaka. He was also a special correspondent of Bangladesh Sangbad Sangstha (BSS) in New Delhi during 1972 to 1976. He served as the advisory editor of the daily Amar Desh. At the same time he was the editor of Weekly Ekhon. Later, he also served as the chief executive of the television channel NTV for some time. Besides, he worked as a part-time teacher of the University of Dhaka for a long time. He was imprisoned for his  reporting in BBC during the presidency of Hussain Mohammad Ershad.

Personal life
Samad was married to Renu. Together they had two daughters and one son, Samia, Nayeema, and Ashequs.

References 

1937 births
2012 deaths
Bangladeshi journalists
Recipients of the Ekushey Padak
Burials at Azimpur Graveyard
Honorary Fellows of Bangla Academy
People from Kishoreganj District